Simin (Persian: سیمین ) is a 2018 Iranian film directed, produced and co-written by Morteza Atashzamzam. The other writers were  Karim Ronasian and Khazar Mehranfar, and the film starred Mohammad Reza Hedayati and Laleh Eskandari. Simin was selected as the opening film of the 31st International Festival of Children and Youth of Isfahan in 2018.

Plot
After drying of the Zayandehrud River, the wells and aqueducts of neighboring villages have also destroyed. The agricultural lands have lost their fertility and the villages have gradually been vacant. Most of its inhabitants migrate to the surrounding cities, leaving only the elderly in the countryside.
Disappointed in finding water, few people remained in the countryside looking for another job. Few people who are more hopeful are still looking for water in the heart of the Qanats.

Cast

 Mohammad-Reza Hedayati
 Laleh Eskandari
 Mohammad Fili
 Sepeideh Mazaheri
 Amir Abbas Rezaei

References

External links
 تولید فیلم سیمین در اصفهان

Persian-language films